Conservationist may refer to the following:
 A member of the conservation movement
 A scientist who works in the field of conservation biology
 A practitioner of conservation and restoration of cultural property
 The Conservationist, a 1974 novel by Nadine Gordimer